An imaginarium is a type of place dedicated to imagination.

Imaginarium may also refer to:

 The Imaginarium Studios, a motion capture studio founded by Andy Serkis
 Imaginarium SA, a Spain-based toy company founded in 1992.
 Imaginaerum, a 2011 Nightwish album (former name Imaginarium)
 Imaginaerum (film), a film based upon the Nightwish album
 Imaginarium: Songs from the Neverhood, a 2004 soundtrack album
 The Imaginarium of Doctor Parnassus, a 2009 film
 Imaginarium (Morifade album), 2002